Thymistida is a genus of moths belonging to the subfamily Drepaninae. It was erected by Francis Walker in 1865

Species
Thymistida nigritincta Warren, 1923
Thymistida tripunctata Walker, 1865
Thymistida undilineata Warren, 1923

References 

Drepaninae
Drepanidae genera
Taxa named by Francis Walker (entomologist)